Aaron "Hotch" Hotchner is a fictional character from the CBS crime drama Criminal Minds, portrayed by Thomas Gibson. He is a Supervisory Special Agent and the unit chief of the FBI's Behavioral Analysis Unit, and has appeared from the series' pilot episode "Extreme Aggressor", which was originally broadcast on September 22, 2005.

Hotchner begins the series married to his high school sweetheart Haley (Meredith Monroe). They have a son named Jack (Cade Owens), though they later separate over Hotchner's dedication to his job. Haley is killed in season five by a serial killer Hotchner and the team are pursuing.

On August 12, 2016, CBS producers announced that Gibson had been dismissed from Criminal Minds following a physical altercation with one of the show's writers, and that "creative details" regarding the character's departure would be announced at a later date. After appearing in the first two episodes of the 2016–2017 season, the Hotchner character was removed from the opening credits of subsequent episodes.

Development
Gibson was cast as Hotchner having previously starred in the comedy series Dharma & Greg. Of the transition to Criminal Minds, he explained: "It's very nice to do a little bit of the darkness after a little bit of the lightness. Variety is the spice of life. I enjoy both and hopefully I will be able to do as big a variety as I possibly can." Gibson's family lives in San Antonio, Texas, while he commuted to Los Angeles to film Criminal Minds on a weekly basis, something he said gave him an insight into Hotchner's divided priorities. Discussing the effect working in the BAU has on the agents' personal lives, Gibson opined: "I think it can't help but take some toll. And the first casualty may not be the agents themselves, but their families, spouses and children." Prior to Hotchner and Haley's separation, in a 2007 interview Gibson stated that he hoped the two would make their relationship last, explaining: "Marriage can certainly survive lots of hardships. You think about in real life the marriages that survive. They certainly suffer... and I think it's going to be very interesting to see how they work it out because I know it's certainly taking its toll. Haley wanted the marriage to work out." Discussing the conflict between Hotchner's career and home life, Gibson explained:

Gibson characterized Hotchner as having "moments of levity", but continued: "Unfortunately, he has a very, very, probably-dusty-it's-so-dry sense of humor. It's pretty dark. It's pretty bone dry. We all need a little levity, but I wouldn't necessarily look for him to break into song and dance. I think Hotch feels there's a lot at stake all the time." Prior to the departure of Jason Gideon (Mandy Patinkin) from the series, Gibson described Gideon and Hotchner as "an old married couple", deeming them father figures to the rest of the BAU and professional peers to one another. Of Hotch's relationship with the rest of the BAU team, Gibson commented:

Before Gibson was cast in the role, the character was originally envisioned as a "blonde haired, blue-eyed Mormon".

Storylines

Backstory
Hotchner first met his future wife Haley Brooks in high school. They married soon thereafter, and had a son, Jack (Cade Owens). Before joining the FBI, Hotchner worked as a prosecutor for the District Attorney's office. He has a younger brother named Sean (Eric Johnson), a New York City-based chef. His mother is an alumna of Mary Baldwin College in Staunton, Virginia. Their father was a workaholic lawyer who survived cancer, and died of a heart attack at 47.

Upon joining the FBI, Hotchner was initially assigned to the Field Office in Seattle, Washington, before transferring to Quantico, Virginia.

In "Natural Born Killer", Hotchner speaks to a serial killer, Vincent Perotta (Patrick Kilpatrick), and discusses the physical abuse Perotta suffered as a child at the hands of his father. Perotta claimed that everyone who is abused as a child becomes a serial killer, with Hotchner correcting him by saying that "some people grow up to become serial killers". When Perotta notices the correction, he asks what the use of "some" means. Hotchner replies, "and some people grow up to catch them". From his explanation to Perotta earlier, it is implied that Hotchner's father was abusive.

Criminal Minds

In general, Hotchner is depicted as a hard-working, humorless, no-nonsense agent who rarely smiles or acts out in anger; his aloof demeanor and composure tend to be mistaken for a complete lack of emotion. He takes great care to avoid antagonizing witnesses, local law enforcement and suspects unless he believes provoking them will cause them to reveal information, occasionally chastising his teammates for needlessly flippant or hostile behavior. With few exceptions, he takes the ethics of his profession very seriously, as evidenced by his angry reaction to Elle Greenaway's (Lola Glaudini) killing of a suspect, which he believed was cold-blooded murder. He occasionally sympathizes with the subjects he pursues, although he universally condemns their behavior and never allows them to justify it.

Following the birth of his son Jack, Hotchner's work with the BAU begins disrupting his family life, and vice versa. He is suspended for two weeks in 2007 following a case at a college campus in Flagstaff, Arizona that ends in disaster when both serial killer Nathan Tubbs (Vince Grant) and copycat killer Anna Begley (Shelly Cole) are killed. Upon returning to work, he requests a transfer to a different division, which pleases Haley, until his coworker Derek Morgan (Shemar Moore) convinces him to help the team with a case in Milwaukee. He changes his mind about leaving the department, and when he returns home, he finds that Haley has taken Jack and left him. He is later served with divorce papers at work. Hotchner attempts to see Jack weekly, but is unable to spend time with him as often as he would like. In the season 3 finale, the team travel to New York to work on a case led by SSA Kate Joyner, who Hotchner previously knew from Scotland Yard. JJ noticed the similarities between SSA Kate Joyner, and Hotchner's now ex-wife, Haley. Hotch sides with Kate in an argument about the case, as opposed to Derek, who turns out to be right. It is implied that Hotchner and Kate were attracted to each other at one point.

At the beginning of the show's fourth season, Hotchner and SSA Kate Joyner (Sienna Guillory) are caught in the bombing outside the New York City Federal Plaza. Joyner eventually dies from her injuries, and Hotchner suffers shrapnel wounds and a punctured eardrum which resulted in hyperacusis, causing temporary hearing problems. Later in the season, the team works one of Hotchner's old cases: the case of the Boston Reaper, a serial killer who preys on couples. Hotchner reveals to head profiler David Rossi (Joe Mantegna) that he had maintained an interest in the case over the 10 years since he had investigated it. It is also shown that the Reaper, a power-hungry predator, had taken an interest in Hotchner. 

Hotchner and the team finally identify the Reaper as George Foyet (C. Thomas Howell) and arrest him, but Foyet escapes from prison shortly afterward, going on the run. In the season four finale, "...And Back", Foyet attacks Hotchner in the latter's apartment. Foyet stabs Hotchner nine times and tortures him with a knife before delivering him to the hospital. Although Hotchner survives, Foyet takes Haley's and Jack's address from Hotch's apartment, requiring them to be placed in protective custody and unable to contact Hotchner. The rest of the team worries that Hotchner is suffering from posttraumatic stress disorder related to the attack. In season 9, Hotchner is hospitalized due to complications from the old stab wounds after collapsing in the team's conference room.

When BAU Section Chief Erin Strauss (Jayne Atkinson) begins putting pressure on Hotchner to justify all of his tactical decisions,  Hotchner decides to step down as unit chief to avoid being reassigned. He relinquishes his position to Morgan, which Morgan accepts on the condition that he will step down once Foyet is captured. Shortly thereafter Foyet reappears, baiting Hotchner through correspondence with an old unsub (The Fox) who had been convicted and imprisoned. With the help of the team, Hotchner proceeds to track Foyet, who poses as a US Marshal in order to locate Haley and Jack. Having gained access to her Witsec-issued home, Foyet forces Haley to call Hotchner on speaker phone. Hotchner manages to issue a code to Jack, which meant for him to go hide in his secret place. However, Hotchner is unable to save Haley; Foyet murders her while she was still talking to him on the phone.

Upon arriving at the house, Hotchner finds Haley's body in the bedroom and notices Foyet hiding behind the curtains. He repeatedly shoots at Foyet's shadow outlined in the curtains only to discover Foyet is wearing a bullet-proof vest. A full-out hand-to-hand fight ensues, with Hotchner subduing Foyet and beating him to death in a fit of rage. During the post-incident inquiry by Strauss, the team demonstrate complete support of Hotchner and his actions, despite Strauss' persistence in painting them as premeditated. Her position towards the events eventually changes upon speaking directly with Hotchner who, when asked what he believed would have happened if Foyet had lived, responds: "I don't have to think; I know that he would have tried to kill my son, too." Strauss concludes that Hotchner's actions were entirely justifiable.

After his ex-wife's murder, Hotchner takes time off to grieve and spend time with his son. He speaks at Haley's funeral. Hotchner is offered early retirement from the BAU in order to be with his son. However, after Haley's sister, Jessica (Molly Baker), offers to stay with Jack when Hotchner has to work, Hotchner decides to return to the BAU. Hotchner attempts to build a better relationship with his son by being his pillar of support. Many of Jack's actions make it clear that he holds his father in high regard. For example, in one scene, Jack is shown playing with two figures at the dinner table. He explains to his father that one figure is Hotchner, while the other is a "bad guy". When Jessica, who is making pancakes for dinner, asks Jack who is going to win, he replies: "Daddy. No one beats Daddy." In another episode, he refuses to dress up as Spider-Man for Halloween because "he's not a real super hero". Instead Jack puts on a suit that is slightly too large for him, and when Hotchner asks him what hero he is supposed to be, he says, "I'm you, Daddy." Later on, Hotchner is asked to coach Jack's soccer team when the team's performance lacks, and he decides to do it with a little help from Rossi, whom he takes on as his assistant. At the end of the episode, Hotchner and Rossi are shown coaching Jack's team and helping them win a game. 

Despite his many responsibilities, after communications officer Jennifer "JJ" Jareau (AJ Cook) leaves the team, Hotchner splits the vacant role with Penelope Garcia (Kirsten Vangsness).

Hotchner runs the psychological review on his team following the supposed death of Emily Prentiss (Paget Brewster).  Hotchner and Jareau staged Prentiss' death to protect her from terrorist Ian Doyle (Timothy V. Murphy).  When Prentiss returns to the bureau following Doyle's capture and the disappearance of his son, the team is shocked and upset.  Hotchner takes full responsibility for keeping the information from his team and says, "If anyone has any issues, they should be directed towards me."

Hotchner is also very protective of Spencer Reid (Matthew Gray Gubler), the youngest member of the team. In the pilot episode "Extreme Aggressor", Hotchner explains that they introduce him as Dr. Spencer Reid instead of Special Agent Spencer Reid so that people will respect him despite his youth. 

Hotchner is promoted to Section Chief after Strauss resigns in the episode "Self-Fulfilling Prophecy" because she had been drinking on the job. This was despite the fact that his involvement in the above mentioned, bungled Arizona case led to his being told that he was not likely to be considered for a promotion.

Later, he makes a connection with a female runner while training for a triathlon. He is hesitant and Rossi feels that is because he is still mourning Haley. Hotchner admits to Rossi that he will go on a bike ride with the woman. At the end of the episode, the woman, Beth Clemmons (Bellamy Young), makes it clear that she is interested in him romantically, leaving Hotchner with an uncharacteristic smile. During the beginning of the episode "Closing Time", it is revealed that Hotchner and Beth have continued training as well as having lunches together. Hotchner then asks her out on a date, which she says yes to. At the end of the episode he shows up a day early with roses, and he and Beth have their first kiss. Later, after running the triathlon, Hotchner finally introduces Beth to Jack. Hotchner and Beth continue to date until season 10, when Hotchner reveals to Rossi that the two ended their relationship as she had received a job offer in Hong Kong.

Departure
Following Gibson's dismissal from the series during the 12th season, the Hotchner character was gradually written out. At the start of the third episode, Emily Prentiss explained Hotchner's absence by remarking that he is on temporary duty assignment.

In episode 12.6 titled "Elliott's Pond" it is revealed that Hotchner is leaving his post as longtime head of the BAU after discovering that serial killer Peter Lewis (Bodhi Elfman) is stalking Jack. Hotchner decides to enter the Witness Protection Program with his son to keep him safe. The move would make it nearly impossible for Hotchner to return to his field of work at the BAU, prompting him to resign from the position. After Lewis' death, Hotchner and Jack leave the Witness Protection Program, but Hotchner chooses to spend time with his son as a full-time father, rather than return to the BAU.

Hotchner personally requests Prentiss as his successor, and she accepts the position despite her doubt over her ability to handle it. He makes one final appearance in the series finale during a flashback to season 1.

References

Episode sources

External links

Criminal Minds characters
Fictional Behavioral Analysis Unit agents
Fictional lawyers
Fictional prosecutors
Television characters introduced in 2005
American male characters in television
Fictional victims of domestic abuse